Modum is a municipality in Buskerud in Viken county, Norway. The administrative centre of the municipality is the town of Vikersund.  The municipality of Modum was established on 1 January 1838 (see formannskapsdistrikt).

The area has a long tradition of skiing with several famous skiers. Modum is home to one of the largest ski jumping hills in the world, Vikersundbakken which is situated in Heggen, outside Geithus.

General information

Name
The municipality (originally the parish) is named after the old Modum farm (Old Norse: Móðheimr), since the first church was built here.  The first element is móða which means "river" (here the Drammenselva river) and the last element is heimr which means "home", "homestead", or "farm". The name of the farm was later changed to Buskerud.

Coat-of-arms
The coat-of-arms is from modern times.  They were granted on 15 March 1985.  The arms show three wavy silver lines “party per bend sinister” on a blue background.  They represent the three main rivers in the municipality: Drammenselva, Snarumselva, and Simoa  and the colour blue represents Blaafarveværket.

Geography
The municipality is bordered in the north by Krødsherad and Ringerike, in the east by Hole and Lier, in the south by Øvre Eiker, and in the west by Sigdal.

Communities
The municipality has three main villages: Åmot, Geithus, and Vikersund.

Åmot is the starting point  of Kunstnerdalen, which was frequently visited by of several Norwegian 19th and 19th century painters: Christian Krohg, Adolph Tidemand and Hans Gude. It also was home to Theodor Kittelsen and Christian Skredsvig. Edvard Munch also painted in Modum. This is also the site of Blaafarveværket whichnow includes a museum and art gallery.

Geithus is the location of two hydroelectric powerplants; Geithusfoss kraftverk and Gravfoss kraftverk.

Vikersund is  the municipality administrative center of Modum and the site of the Modum City Hall. It is also the site of Vikersundbakken.

Notable residents

Public service & business 

 Hans Gulbranson (1787 in Modum – 1868) pioneer developer of the textile industry
 Gudbrand Gregersen de Saág (1824 in Modum – 1910) Norwegian-Hungarian bridge engineer
 Anders Sveaas (1840 in Modum – 1917) founded the Kistefos Wood Pulp Mill
 Albert Collett (1842 at Buskerud Manor – 1896) timber merchant, sawmill owner, founded Firma Albert Collett
 Nils P. Haugen (1849 in Modum – 1931), member of the United States House of Representatives from Wisconsin
 Charles E. Hanson (1855 in Modum – 1932), member of the Wisconsin State Assembly
 Christopher Hornsrud (1859 in Skotselv, Øvre Eiker – 1960), Norwegian Prime Minister in 1928
 Christian Hansen Tandberg (1872 at Nykirke – 1951) farmer, deputy mayor of Modum 1920's
 Hjalmar Steenstrup (1890 in Modum – 1945) insurance agent and Milorg pioneer
 Erling Diesen (born 1932 in Geithus) a Norwegian engineer and civil servant

The Arts 
 Maurits Hansen (1774 in Modum – 1843), author, contributor to the Romantic Movement
 Thorvald Lammers (1841 in Modum – 1922) baritone singer, choral conductor & composer
 Andreas Edvard Disen (1845 in Modum – 1923) a mountain landscape painter
 Hans Andersen Foss (1851 in Modum – 1929) Norwegian-American author, newspaper editor
 Christian Skredsvig (1854 in Modum – 1924) painter and writer, style reflected naturalism 
 Arild Formoe (1912 in Modum – 2006), accordion player and orchestra conductor
 Thure Erik Lund (born 1959 in Vikersund) author and cabinet maker

Sport 
 Art Jorgens (1905 in Modum – 1980) catcher in Major League Baseball for New York Yankees
 Knut Østby (1922 in Modum – 2010) sprint canoeist, silver medallist, 1948 Summer Olympics
 Ole Gunnar Fidjestøl (born 1960), ski jumper team bronze medallist at the 1988 Winter Olympics, works in Vikersund
 Tom Gulbrandsen (born 1964) retired footballer with almost 300 club caps and 17 for Norway
 Ole Einar Bjørndalen (born 1974 in Simostranda), ski biathlete with 13 Winter Olympic Games medals

Sister cities
The following cities are twinned with Modum:
  Laukaa, Western Finland, Finland
  Stevns, Region Sjælland, Denmark
  Östra Göinge, Skåne County, Sweden

Gallery

References

External links

Municipal fact sheet from Statistics Norway

Blaafarveværket Cobalt mines
Culture in Modum on the map from Kulturnett.no

 
Municipalities of Buskerud
Municipalities of Viken (county)
Ringerike (traditional district)